Randwick Girls' High School (RGHS) is a school located in Randwick, New South Wales, Australia, between Barker and Avoca Streets. It is a girls high school operated by the New South Wales Department of Education with students from years 7 to 12. The school was established in January 1959.

History and campus 
The history of Randwick Girls High dates back to 1883, when Randwick Public School was established by the NSW Government. The school, to accommodate 200 students, was built on land at the top of Avoca Street, Randwick in 1886. The senior functions of the school became a Superior Public School in 1913, a Junior High School in 1944, and finally split with a Boys High School in 1949, who eventually moved further south down Avoca street, joined later with the establishment of Randwick Girls' High School in 1959. Since the 1990s, Randwick Girls has participated in the Rock Eisteddfod Challenge jointly with its brother school, Randwick Boys High School. Many places have been gained by the combined team, first reaching the finals in 1995, being a regular finalist since that time, and winning the Premier Division in 2001, 2002, 2003, 2006, and 2007.

Notable alumni 
 Tamsin Colley - paralympian
 Molly Contogeorge – singer-songwriter and keyboardist

See also 

 List of Government schools in New South Wales
 Rock Eisteddfod Challenge results

References

External links 

Public high schools in Sydney
Girls' schools in New South Wales
Randwick, New South Wales
Rock Eisteddfod Challenge participants
School buildings completed in 1959
Educational institutions established in 1959
1959 establishments in Australia
Alliance of Girls' Schools Australasia